Volodymyr Vasylovych Sikevych, September 5, 1870 – July 27, 1952, was a General Khorunzhy of the Ukrainian People's Army of the Ukrainian People's Republic (UNR) during the Ukrainian-Soviet War.

Biography
Volodymyr Sikevych was born in village Tarashcha, Kiev Governorate. He served as a colonel in the general staff of the Russian Imperial Army. During the Ukrainian War of Independence (1917–20) he was the brigadier general of the Army of the Ukrainian People's Republic and head of the Repatriation Commission of the UNR consulates in Hungary and Austria (1919–20). In 1924 he moved to Canada (Winnipeg and Toronto) and was active in Ukrainian veterans' organizations. Sikevych is an author of book Storinky iz zapysnoï knyzhky.

References 

1870 births
1952 deaths
People from Tarashcha
People from Tarashchansky Uyezd
Generals of the Ukrainian People's Republic
Russian military personnel of World War I
Ukrainian people of World War I
Ukrainian emigrants to Canada
Recipients of the Order of St. Anna, 2nd class
Recipients of the Order of St. Anna, 3rd class
Recipients of the Order of St. Anna, 4th class
Recipients of the Order of St. Vladimir, 3rd class
Recipients of the Order of St. Vladimir, 4th class